Blackwood's Magazine was a British magazine and miscellany printed between 1817 and 1980. It was founded by the publisher William Blackwood and was originally called the Edinburgh Monthly Magazine. The first number appeared in April 1817 under the editorship of Thomas Pringle and James Cleghorn. The journal was unsuccessful and Blackwood fired Pringle and Cleghorn and relaunched the journal as Blackwood's Edinburgh Magazine under his own editorship. The journal eventually adopted the shorter name and from the relaunch often referred to itself as Maga. The title page bore the image of George Buchanan, a 16th-century Scottish historian, religious and political thinker.

Description
Blackwood's was conceived as a rival to the Whig-supporting Edinburgh Review. Compared to the rather staid tone of The Quarterly Review, the other main Tory work, Maga was ferocious and combative. This is due primarily to the work of its principal writer John Wilson, who wrote under the pseudonym of Christopher North. Never trusted with the editorship, he nevertheless wrote much of the magazine along with the other major contributors John Gibson Lockhart and William Maginn. Their mixture of satire, reviews and criticism both barbed and insightful was extremely popular and the magazine quickly gained a large audience.

For all its conservative credentials the magazine published the works of radicals of British romanticism such as Percy Bysshe Shelley and Samuel Taylor Coleridge, as well as early feminist essays by American John Neal. Through Wilson the magazine was a keen supporter of William Wordsworth, parodied the Byronmania common in Europe and angered John Keats, Leigh Hunt and William Hazlitt by referring to their works as the "Cockney School of Poetry". The controversial style of the magazine got it into trouble when, in 1821, John Scott, the editor of the London Magazine, fought a duel with Jonathan Henry Christie over libellous statements in the magazine. John Scott was shot and killed.

By the mid-1820s Lockhart and Maginn had departed to London, the former to edit the Quarterly and the latter to write for a range of journals, though principally for Fraser's Magazine. After this, John Wilson was by far the most important writer for the magazine and gave it much of its tone, popularity and notoriety. In this period Blackwood's became the first British literary journal to publish work by an American with an 1824 essay by John Neal that got reprinted across Europe. Over the following year and a half the magazine published Neal's "American Writers" series, which is the first written history of American literature.

By the 1840s when Wilson was contributing less, its circulation declined. Aside from essays it also printed a good deal of horror fiction and this is regarded as an important influence on later Victorian writers such as Charles Dickens, the Brontë sisters, and Edgar Allan Poe; Poe even satirised the magazine's obsessions in "Loss of Breath: A Tale A La Blackwood," and "How to Write a Blackwood Article." The four surviving Brontë siblings were avid readers and mimicked the style and content in their Young Men's Magazine and other writings in their childhood paracosm, including Glass Town and Angria.

The magazine never regained its early success but it still held a dedicated readership throughout the British Empire amongst those in the Colonial Service. One late nineteenth century triumph was the first publication of Joseph Conrad's Heart of Darkness in the February, March, and April 1899 issues of the magazine.

Important contributors included: George Eliot, Joseph Conrad, John Buchan, George Tomkyns Chesney, Samuel Taylor Coleridge, Felicia Hemans, James Hogg, Charles Neaves, Thomas de Quincey, Elizabeth Clementine Stedman, William Mudford, Margaret Oliphant, Hugh Clifford, Mary Margaret Busk and Frank Swettenham. Robert Macnish contributed under the epithet, Modern Pythagorean. It was an open secret that Charles Whibley contributed anonymously his Musings without Methods to the Magazine for over twenty-five years. T. S. Eliot described them "the best sustained piece of literary journalism that I know of in recent times".

The magazine finally ceased publication in 1980, having remained for its entire history in the Blackwood family. Mike Blackwood was the last family member to manage the firm and now enjoys retirement in England with his wife Jayne.

The Blackwood's name lives on in the name of the bar at the Nira Caledonia Hotel in Gloucester Place, Edinburgh, the former home of John Wilson from 1827 until his death in 1854.

Cultural references
Edgar Allan Poe published a short story entitled How to Write a Blackwood Article in November 1838 as a companion piece to A Predicament.

In Dorothy Sayers's detective novel Five Red Herrings (1931) the Scottish Procurator-Fiscal working with Lord Peter Wimsey is mentioned as "reading the latest number of Blackwood to wile away the time" as they spend several boring night hours while waiting for the murderer to reveal himself.

Vera Brittain lists "numerous copies of Blackwood's Magazine" among her literary possessions in her description of her time as V.A.D. nurse in Malta in her memoir, Testament of Youth (1933).

In George Orwell's Burmese Days (1934), the main protagonist, James Flory, associates the magazine with mediocre crassness as he thinks about the other British at the European Club: "Dull boozing witless porkers! Was it possible that they could go on week after week, year after year, repeating word for word the same evil-mined drivel, like a parody of a fifth-rate story in Blackwood's? Would none of them ever think of anything new to say? Oh, what a place, what people! What a civilization is this of ours—this godless civilization founded on whisky, Blackwood's and the Bonzo pictures!"

In Part Four of the Doctor Who story "The Talons of Weng Chiang" (broadcast on 19 March 1977), Professor Litefoot is seen reading the February 1892 issue. (Doctor Who Magazine 475, p. 67)

See also
Tait's Edinburgh Magazine
The Young Men's Magazine

Notes

List of publications

Further reading
Finkelstein, David. The House of Blackwood. Author–Publisher Relations in the Victorian Age. University Park, PA: Pennsylvania State University Press, 2002. 
Finkelstein, David (ed.), Print Culture and the Blackwood Tradition 1805–1930. Toronto: University of Toronto Press, 2006. 
Flynn, Philip, 'Beginning Blackwood's : The Right Mix of Dulce and Utile', Victorian Periodicals Review 39: 2, Summer 2006, pp. 136–157

External links

Comprehensive listing  of Blackwood's Magazine archives from various sources at the Online Books Page
Archived Blackwood's Magazine on the Internet Archive

1817 establishments in the United Kingdom
1980 disestablishments in the United Kingdom
 
Defunct literary magazines published in the United Kingdom
Magazines established in 1817
Magazines disestablished in 1980
Literary magazines published in Scotland
Mass media in Edinburgh

de:Blackwood & Sons#Blackwood's Edinburgh Magazine